La Mitrailleuse is a painting by British Futurist artist Christopher Nevinson, made in 1915 while he was on honeymoon leave from service as an ambulance driver with the RAMC on the Western Front in the First World War.  In an article in The Burlington Magazine in 1916, artist Walter Sickert called the work "the most authoritative and concentrated utterance on the war in the history of painting".

Mitrailleuse is the French word for machine gun, and originated from the mid-19th century French volley gun, the mitrailleuse.  The painting shows three soldiers in the trenches wearing metal Adrian helmets, one firing a machine gun.  A fourth soldier lies dead beside them.  Around them are wooden beams and barbed wire.  The subjects are abstracted into angular geometric blocks of colour, becoming dehumanised components in a machine of death.  Nevinson later wrote: "To me the soldier going to be dominated by the machine ... I was the first man to express this feeling on canvas."

The painting measures . It was exhibited at the Grafton Galleries and Leicester Galleries in 1916, and donated to the Tate Gallery by the Contemporary Art Society in 1917. It is currently exhibited at the Tate Britain.

References
 La Mitrailleuse, Tate Gallery
 La Mitrailleuse: catalogue entry, Tate Gallery
 Dynamic of Destruction : Culture and Mass Killing in the First World War, Professor Alan Kramer, p.170-172
 The Future of War: The Re-Enchantment of War in the Twenty-First Century, Christopher Coker, p.64

 

Futurist paintings
1915 paintings
Paintings by Christopher R. W. Nevinson
Collection of the Tate galleries